Epilobium pedunculare (E. linnaeoides), the rockery willowherb, is a species of Epilobium similar to E. brunnescens. It is found on the Antipodean Islands, Chatham Island, Macquarie Island, and both the North and South Island of New Zealand.

Description
With leaves tooth 4 to 9 mm.

Distribution
A native of New Zealand, the species has now naturalized in Ireland.

References

Endemic flora of New Zealand
Flora of Ireland
pedunculare